Jon Miller (born John Miller, 14 July 1921 – 30 July 2008) was a British television presenter who was best known for his appearances on the educational children's television science programme How between 1966 and 1981 with Jack Hargreaves, Bunty James and Fred Dinenage.

Early life
Born in Southend-on-Sea, Essex, in 1921, Miller was a cousin of classical violinist Yehudi Menuhin. His mother, Edie, was a concert pianist and his father, Jack, established a chain of kiosks and shops in London selling tobacco, sweets and fishing tackle.

Miller was brought up in London and on the West Sussex coast where, at the family's holiday home, an early fascination for marine life was nurtured.

Career
Miller attended Bedales School and studied photography at the Reimann School in London between 1939 and 1941. In World War II he served in the RAF as an aerial photographer.

In 1947 he volunteered for the brigade working on the post-war Yugoslav Youth Railway construction project. He then worked for his father's retail business and was also employed by the Zoological Society of London to stock the aquarium at London Zoo. This involved travelling to the Soviet Union, Madeira, the West Indies, Mauritius and the Azores.

Miller worked, as a naturalist, for the BBC on the Johnny Morris show Animal Magic (in one episode putting a snake on Morris' head). He was hired in 1962 by Southern Television and appeared in its regional news magazine Day by Day, talking each week about a different animal.

Also at Southern, Miller was spotted by Jack Hargreaves on a 1965 April Fool's Day edition of the children's magazine programme Three Go Round, demonstrating how Beatle wigs were supposedly made from the hairs of beetles' legs. Hargreaves recruited Miller to appear on How where he became known for his demonstrations of chemistry experiments. Fellow presenter Dinenage later recalled "He lived his life for explosions. He was never happier than when he was creating a big bang and those were the days before the health-and-safety police."

Miller moved to Cornwall in 1969, and lived there after retirement. He appeared regularly in Westward Television's Westward Diary. How came to an ended in 1981 (although later revived without Miller).

In his retirement Miller was a frequent letter-writer to newspapers and magazines. Answering the question as to why roosters crow in the morning in a 1998 edition of New Scientist, he explained that the dawn chorus was "probably largely territorial", adding, "... roosters do not always crow at dawn. If your questioner visits Cornwall on 11 August next year, she will be able to hear the dawn chorus, including the roosters, during the false dawn at the end of the total eclipse of the sun, which will occur during the middle of the day."

Personal life 
Miller was married, in 1947, to Rita Hallerman and they had one son and two daughters. The marriage was dissolved and in 1965 he married again, to Cecily Power, with whom he had two more daughters. He died in Helston, Cornwall on 30 July 2008.

Books
A Fellow of the Zoological Society of London, Miller wrote a number of books:
 Of Fish and Men (1958)
 Mountains in the Sea (1972)
 How To Keep Unusual Pets (1975)
 How To Fool Your Brain (1975)

References

External links 
 
 How! at Television Heaven

1921 births
2008 deaths
English television presenters
Alumni of Reimann School (London)